Anixia interrupta is a species of fungus belonging to the Anixia genus. It was documented in 1832 by German-American mycologist Lewis David de Schweinitz.

References  

Agaricomycetes
Fungi described in 1832